Senator Pierson may refer to:

Arthur N. Pierson (1867–1957), New Jersey State Senate
Henry R. Pierson (1819–1890), New York State Senate